Zhang Wuling (1889–1938) was a Chinese educator. Zhang was noted for promoting Chinese women's education and Chinese educational equality, he founded Suzhou Leyi Girls' School and Pinglin Middle School in Suzhou, Jiangsu. He was the father of poet Zhang Chonghe and scholar Zhang Yunhe.

Names
His birth name was Zhang Wuling. His style name was Shengjin, he also known as Jiyou and Jiyou.

Biography
Zhang was born in Hefei, Anhui, in 1889, the grandson of Zhang Shusheng, a high-ranking military officer in the Huai Army.

Zhang moved to Shanghai in 1912. In 1918, he moved to Suzhou, he established Suzhou Leyi Girls' School in 1921 and Pinglin Middle School in 1925.

In 1937, the Second Sino-Japanese War broke out, he escaped from the flames of war with his family and moved to his hometown. Zhang died in there in 1938, aged 49.

Personal life

In 1906, Zhang married Lu Ying in Hefei, Anhui. They had six sons and four daughters.

Sons: 
 Zhang Ninghe 
 Zhang Yuhe
 Zhang Yinhe
 Zhang Zonghe
 Zhang Dinghe
 Zhang Huanhe

Daughters:  
 Chang Yuen-ho (husband: Gu Chuanjie)
 Zhang Yunhe (husband: Zhou Youguang)
 Chang Chao-ho (husband: Shen Congwen)
 Chang Ch'ung-ho (husband: Hans Fränkel)

References

1889 births
1938 deaths
People from Hefei
Educators from Anhui